The Port of Mukalla is a key Yemeni seaport. The port is the only maritime port in Hadramout overlooking the Arabian Sea.

History 

The current port of Mukalla was opened in January 1985.

Location 
The port is located in Mukalla, the capital of Hadramawt and the fifth-largest city in Yemen.The port is the largest Yemeni seaport on the Arabian sea. The port is a multi purpose port serving commercial, fish and oil products for the Hadramout and surrounding governorates eastern Yemen. The port receives dry bulk cargo vessels, container vessels, general cargo ships, liquid cargo ships, RO/RO vessels.

See also 

 Port of Aden
 Hudaydah Port
 Yemen Red Sea Ports Corporation
 Yemen Gulf of Aden Ports Corporation
 Yemen Arabian Sea Ports Corporation

References

External links 

 

Transport in Yemen
Government of Yemen
Mukalla
Arabian Sea
Ports and harbours of Yemen
Transport in the Arabian Sea